Jagjit Singh Dardi (born 19 January 1949) is a journalist and an educationist from the Indian State of Punjab. He is the Editor-in-Chief of  the Punjabi language daily newspaper Chardikala, a newspaper that was started in 1977.  In 1970 Dardi started a fortnightly Charhdikala Marg, whose Founder Editor was his father G Harnam Singh. This fortnightly paper  was converted into a daily newspaper in 1977. He is the Chairman of the Punjabi news channel Chardilkala Time TV. He is also the Chairman of Sri Guru Harkrishan Group of Institutes which is a chain of institutes of higher education. He was awarded Padma Shri in the year 2022 for his services in national integration, communal harmony, contributions in the field of media, education and promotion of Punjabi language, culture and heritage. Now Department of Public Relation Chandigarh administration announced  Mr. Jagjit Singh Dardi as a Chairperson of Chandigarh press accreditation committee. Popular Punjabi Media house Nirpakh Post   publish a biography of Mr. Dardi.

Recognition: Padma Shri
In the year 2022, Govt of India conferred the Padma Shri award, the third highest award in the Padma series of awards, on Jagjit Singh Dardi for his distinguished service in the field of trade and industry. The award is in recognition of his service as a "Veteran Punjabi Media Leader and Educationist, Chairman of Chardikala group".

Other recognitions

Other recognitions conferred on Jagjit Singh Dardi include:

Shiromani Patarkar Award by President of India  in 1998
Shiromani Sahitkar Award by Govt. of Punjab in 1992
Honoured by World Punjabi Conferences in 1997 in the US and in Canada in 1989
Member of Press/ Media Advisory Committees of Lok Sabha in 1997-98 and Rajya Sabha in 2014
Member of the executive committee of The Newspaper Society (INS) since 1988
Member of Press Council of India since 2001
Member of Prime Ministers' media delegation since 1993

References

Journalists from Punjab, India
Indian television journalists
1949 births
Living people